Ulises Ramón Coronel González (born 1998) is a Paraguayan professional footballer who plays as a midfielder. He played for Cerro Porteño and Atlético Colegiales between 2017 and 2019. In 2015, Coronel was a member of the Paraguay U17 national team.

Career

Early career
Coronel began playing in the youth teams at Guaraní before joining the under-14 team at Cerro Porteño PF. Scout Hernan Acuña saw him there and took him to trial at Cerro Porteño.

Cerro Porteño
Coronel joined Cerro Porteño's under-15 squad when it was coached by Diego Gavilan.

2016 season
In April 2016, Coronel scored in a 9–1 victory against River Plate Asunción in the U18 Torneo Apertura.

2017 season
In January 2017, Coronel signed a 4 year contract with Cerro Porteño and began pre-season training with the first-team. In the Cerro Porteño first-team were players Antony Silva, Nelson Valdez, Jose Ortigoza, Victor Caceres, the Argentine Diego Churín and Uruguayan Álvaro Pereira. Coronel and his youth team colleague Fabian Franco were both chosen to form part of the first-team to take part in the 2017 pre-season. To get to training, Coronel would catch the bus to take him to the Mercado 4 in Asunción and he'd walk from there to the club. During the pre-season, Coronel scored for Cerro Porteño in a 3-0 victory against Deportivo Minga Guazu at the Estadio Antonio Aranda. In January 2017, Coronel played for the first-team in a game against Independiente CG and scored. On 5 February 2017, Coronel made his debut in a 3–0 away victory against Rubio Ñú, being in the starting 11 players before being substituted off in the first half. He played 18 minutes of the fixture. The team were crowned champions of the 2017 Torneo Apertura. In May 2017, Coronel scored the equalizing goal in a 2-2 draw against Libertad in the APF U19 Apertura Tournament. He scored in the 84th minute of the game. In July 2017, Coronel suffered an ankle fracture and was to be intervened surgically.

2018 season
On 25 February 2018, Coronel scored the winning goal in a 2–1 away victory for Cerro Porteño against Libertad in the Torneo de Reserva. In May 2018, Coronel scored the opening goal in the 6th minute of the first half in a 4-3 home victory against Libertad in a reserve game. In August 2018, Coronel played in a 2–1 away victory against 3 de Febrero in the Torneo de Reserva. Coronel played a total of 17 league games in the 2018 Torneo de Reserva, scoring 3 goals.

Atlético Colegiales
In 2019, Coronel joined Primera B side Atlético Colegiales. In June 2019, Coronel scored the second goal for Atlético Colegiales in the 64th minute of a 2–0 away victory against Athletic Club in the Copa Paraguay. In August 2019, Coronel played in a 3–0 loss against Olimpia Asunción in the second round of the Copa Paraguay. In September 2019, Coronel scored in a 3-1 home victory for Atlético Colegiales against Capitan Figari.

International career
In June 2015, Coronel represented Paraguay at under-17 level at the Copa Mitad del Mundo in Ecuador. He appeared as a substitute and scored a double in a 7–1 victory against Universidad de San Martín.

Personal life
Coronel is from the city of Ñemby. In 2017, Coronel stated that his reference were Paraguayan footballer Marcelo Estigarribia and Belgian footballer Eden Hazard.

Honours
Cerro Porteño
 Primera División: 2017 Clausura

References

External links
 
 
 Ulises Coronel at playmakerstats.com (English version of ceroacero.es)
 
 

1998 births
Living people
Cerro Porteño players
Paraguayan footballers
Association football midfielders